Ark Boulton Academy (formerly Golden Hillock School) is a coeducational secondary school located in Sparkhill in the south of Birmingham,  England. It was established in 1910 and educates just under 900 pupils. In September 2015 the school joined the Ark after the Trojan Horse scandal. The current interim principal is Mr Daniel Richards.

In 2014, the school was under investigation for promoting radical Islamic view to pupils: see Operation Trojan Horse.

The school has a higher than average number of pupils eligible for free school meals. In 2015, Ofsted reported that all its pupils were from ethnic minorities, and the majority spoke English as an additional language. The school has an average number of students with special educational needs. The school was judged 'Good' by Ofsted in 2017.

References

Educational institutions established in 1910
Secondary schools in Birmingham, West Midlands
1910 establishments in England
Academies in Birmingham, West Midlands
Ark schools